Greatest Hits is a compilation album released by American country music artist Sylvia. It was released in 1987 via RCA Records was produced by various individuals, including Tom Collins and Brent Maher. It was the last album released by Sylvia while she was recording for the RCA record label. It also spawned one single, which became a minor hit on the Billboard country chart.

Background, release and reception
Sylvia had commercial success at RCA as a recording artist in the 1980s. Under the supervision of producer Tom Collins, he established her sound around upbeat country pop melodies. However, her 1986 album was not released by the label and she was eventually dropped by the label in 1987. Greatest Hits would be her final album released by her label before she would be dropped. It included a total of nine tracks. Seven of the album's tracks were among Sylvia's biggest hits. This included her two number one singles: "Drifter" (1981) and "Nobody" (1982). Also featured are the top ten hits "Snapshot" (1983), "I Never Quite Got Back (From Loving You)" (1983), "Fallin' in Love" (1985) and "Cry Just a Little Bit" (1985). During her time at RCA, Sylvia collaborated with various producers, resulting in a series of production credits on the album.

Greatest Hits was released in 1987 on RCA Records. It was released in several formats, including a cassette and compact disc. Following its release, the album spent eight weeks on the Billboard Top Country Albums chart. In August 1987, it peaked at number 59. It is Sylvia's final charting album to date The album also included two new songs, notably "Straight from the Heart." The track was spawned as the album's only single in February 1987, also via RCA. Spending six weeks on the Billboard Hot Country Songs chart, it eventually peaked at number 66 in May 1987. Thom Owens of Allmusic gave a mostly positive response in his review of Greatest Hits, calling it "brief but entertaining."

Track listing

Vinyl and cassette versions

Compact disc version

Personnel
All credits are adapted from the liner notes of Greatest Hits.

Musical and technical personnel
 Tom Collins – producer (tracks 1-3, 7, 9)
 Bill Brunt – art direction, design
 Tim DuBois – producer (track 6)
 Greg Gorman – photography
 Scott Hendricks – producer (track 6)
 Brent Maher – producer (tracks, 4, 5, 8)
 Don Potter – producer (tracks 4, 5, 8)
 Danny Purcell – mastering 
 Sylvia – lead vocals, background vocals

Chart performance

Release history

References

1987 greatest hits albums
Albums produced by Tom Collins (record producer)
Albums produced by Scott Hendricks
Albums produced by Brent Maher
RCA Records compilation albums
Sylvia (singer) albums